Pantea or Pântea is a Persian female given name and Romanian surname. Notable people with the name include:

Given name
Pantea Arteshbod, Persian lieutenant commander
Pantea Bahram, Iranian actress
Pantea Panahiha, Iranian actress
Pantea Rahmani, Iranian artist
Pantea Beigi, Iranian-American human rights advocate

Surname
Alexandru Pantea (born 2003), Romanian footballer
Aurel Pantea (born 1952), Romanian poet
Gherman Pântea (1894–1968), Bessarabian soldier
Nicolae Pantea (born 1946), Romanian footballer

Persian feminine given names
Romanian-language surnames